A kanal is a unit of area used in Pakistan.

A kanal is equal to 20 marlas.

See also
 Marla (unit)

References

Units of area
Customary units in India
Pakistani culture